FUNDESEM Business School is an international business school located in Alicante, Spain. The school is owned and operated by the FUNDESEM Foundation, which comprises more than 200 companies and institutions.

Programs
FUNDESEM  offers several graduate master's degree programs, including:
Master in Business Administration (MBA)
Executive MBA
International MBA (IMBA) 
Master in Human Resources Management
Master in International Business
Master in Financial Management
Master in Commercial Management and Marketing
They include   international MBA Double Degree Program  i n collaboration with a number of European and non-European business schools, taught entirely in English taught entirely in English

There   are also a number of non-graduate management training and in-company programs.

In 2010 the school was one of Spain's top 20 according to the Eduniversal World Ranking. Several of its   programs ranked among the five best in the country in 2010,  according to Spanish daily El Mundo (Spain). A number of grants financed by industry were created in mid-2011 at the school for business courses students.

Affiliations

The School has signed a number of student exchange programs with international educational institutions such as the University of Birmingham in the UK and the Georgia Institute of Technology College of Management in the USA.

It is a member of the 'Latin American Council of Business Schools' CLADEA and the 'European Foundation for Management Development' EFMD.

Publishing
Early in 2011 it was reported that the School would launch its own publishing house under its commercial name. As of today two titles have been published in Spanish.

Recent years 
In 2012, Luis Gámir replaced Mr  as chairman of FUNDESEM and a new management team started to lead the business school.

References

External links
FUNDESEM Business School Official Website
FUNDESEM Alumni Blog
CLADEA, Latin American Council of Business Schools
EFMD, European Foundation for Management Development

See also
List of business schools in Europe

Business schools in Spain
Alicante
Education in the Valencian Community